The Yungay Province is one of twenty provinces of the Ancash Region in Peru.

Geography 
The Cordillera Blanca and the Cordillera Negra traverse the province. Waskaran, the highest elevation of Peru, lies on the border to the Carhuaz Province. Chakrarahu, Chopicalqui, Tullparahu and Yanarahu (Ruriqucha) belong to the highest peaks of the province. Other mountains are listed below:

Political division
Yungay is divided into eight districts, which are:
 Cascapara 
 Mancos 
 Matacoto 
 Quillo 
 Ranrahirca 
 Shupluy 
 Yanama 
 Yungay

Ethnic groups 
The people in the province are mainly indigenous citizens of Quechua descent. Quechua is the language which the majority of the population (73.19%) learnt to speak in childhood, 26.48 	% of the residents started speaking using the Spanish language (2007 Peru Census).

See also 
 Kiswar
 Llankanuku Lakes
 Qanchisqucha

References

External links
 www.yungayperu.com.pe

Yungay Province